The 2009–10 Oakland Golden Grizzlies men's basketball team were a National Collegiate Athletic Association Division I college basketball team representing Oakland University.  Oakland finished the season 26–9 overall, 17–1 in The Summit League and were the league's regular season and conference tournament champions. The Golden Grizzlies received The Summit League's automatic berth into the NCAA tournament and, as a No. 14 seed, lost to  No. 3 Pittsburgh in the first round.

Preseason
Oakland was picked to win The Summit League championship, receiving 34 of the 35 first place votes.  The Golden Grizzlies returned three starters from the 2008–09 team, plus senior Derick Nelson, who sat out the majority of the previous season due to a foot injury.

Also returning for Oakland was senior point guard Johnathon Jones, who led all Division I players in assists and junior center Keith Benson, who was being projected as a first round National Basketball Association draft pick.  Benson, Jones and Nelson were each selected to The Summit League's pre-season all-league teams with Jones being selected as the pre-season Player of the Year.

Oakland's schedule included road games against the pre-season consensus number one and two teams, Kansas and Michigan State.

Season
Oakland finished the non-conference portion of their schedule with a 6–7 record.  OU lost all their games against BCS conference teams (0–5) and went 6–2 against the rest of the schedule, losing to Eastern Michigan and Memphis.

The Golden Grizzlies opened The Summit League schedule winning their first nine games, marking their best start in league history.  During the steak Oakland defeated  67–64, their first win at the Mabee Center in 10 years. The loss for ORU was just the sixth Summit League home loss for ORU in its last 59.

Records
Jones became The Summit League's all-time leading assists leader with 11 assists against  on November 28, 2009. Jones broke the record of 626 held by Bryce Drew of Valparaiso.

Jones broke the conference and school records for consecutive free throws, having made 43 in a row from December 5 through January 23.  Jones broke the school record of 33, set by Scott Bittinger in the 1987–88 season.

Jones also set Oakland school records for career games played and career games started. Jones passed Patrick McCloskey for most games played with 125 from 2004–08 and Dan Champagne, who set the previous record of 113 games started from 1997–2002.

Oakland tied The Summit League's record for consecutive regular season win with their 16th victory in a row against .  The 16 wins span two seasons and tied the Cleveland State team that won 16 in a row in 1992 and 1993.

Milestones
Benson became the 28th player in Oakland history to score at least 1,000 career points. Current teammates Jones (1,674) and Nelson (1,529) are also members of the 1,000-point club.

Jones scored his 1,500th career point in the January 24 victory against South Dakota State.  Nelson scored his 1,500th point during the finals of The Summit League tournament in which he led Oakland to the title with a career-high 36 points.  Jones was the 15th and Nelson the 16th player in OU history to join the 1,500-point club.

Roster

* Redshirting 2009–10 season

Schedule

|-
!colspan=9| Exhibition

|-
!colspan=9| Regular season

|-
!colspan=9| 2010 The Summit League men's basketball tournament

|-
!colspan=10| 2010 NCAA Division I men's basketball tournament

References

Oakland Golden Grizzlies
Oakland Golden Grizzlies men's basketball seasons
Oakland
Oakland
Oakland